Flavone is an organic compound with the formula . A white solid, flavone is a derivative of chromone with a phenyl (Ph) substituent adjacent to the ether group.  The compound is of little direct practical importance, but susbstituted derivatives, the flavones and  flavonoids are a large class of nutritionally important natural products. Flavone can be prepared in the laboratory by cyclization of 2-hydroxacetophenone.  Isomeric with flavone is isoflavone, where the phenyl group is adjacent to the ketone.

References